The Mira climbing rat (Tylomys mirae) is a species of rodent in the family Cricetidae.
It is found in Colombia and Ecuador.

References

Tylomys
Mammals of Colombia
Mammals described in 1899
Taxa named by Oldfield Thomas
Taxonomy articles created by Polbot